Cabela's Dangerous Hunts: Ultimate Challenge is the first of the Cabela's games to be released on PlayStation Portable. It is a port of Cabela's Dangerous Hunts 2, with the addition of some new features. The game was co-developed by Sand Grain Studios and Fun Labs, and published by Activision, in conjunction with hunting supply company Cabela's. It was released on April 4, 2006, in North America and on March 21, 2007, in Australia.

Gameplay 
The game is similar to the second game, with the addition of a Quick Action Mode and including two new animals: the Burchell's zebra and African wild dog (though under protection). The game modes are: Quick Hunt, Action Zone, and Career. The player's objective is to hunt and track deadly animals like bears, leopards, rhinos and cape buffalos, among others.

External links 

2006 video games
PlayStation Portable games
Activision games
PlayStation Portable-only games
Video games set in Argentina
Video games set in Australia
Video games set in India
Video games set in Russia
Video games set in Tanzania
Video games set in the United States
Cabela's video games
Video games developed in Romania
Fun Labs games
Single-player video games
Sand Grain Studios games